Proximus TV (former Belgacom TV), subsidiary of the Belgacom Group, provides Digital TV (IPTV) services over its own IPTV Platform in Belgium. It was launched in the summer of 2005.

Proximus TV is distributed using ADSL/VDSL solution. This IPTV service was originally distributed over ADSL which later evolved to ADSL2+. More recently, the Broadway Project started providing fiber to the street cabinets and VDSL2 from the street cabinets to the home. By increasing bandwidth and evolving from MPEG-2 to MPEG-4 AVC compression, Proximus TV currently offers high-definition television to many Belgian households.

Like satellite broadcasts, and unlike cable distributors, the distribution of Proximus TV is not limited to a certain municipality or province. In December 2008, coverage of Proximus TV was 86.6% of all Belgian households, and High Definition TV was available to 64%.

At the end of March 2013, there were 1,412,000 Proximus TV subscribers, including the so-called "dual stream" subscribers.

By end 2014, Proximus’ TV customer base counted 1,288,000 TV households, or 1,593,000 subscriptions when including multiple set-top boxes.

In September 2014, Belgacom TV became Proximus TV.

Belgian soccer Surprise 
A few months before the launch of Belgacom TV, on 9 May 2005, Belgacom Group took the whole market by surprise when it acquired the broadcasting rights for the Jupiler Pro League (Belgian Football League).

Technology and reception 

Customers must purchase or rent a (PVR) HD IPTV set-top box, models support as of June 2015 are made by Cisco & Scientific-Atlanta (now a Cisco owned company). Also necessary is a subscription to Proximus TV, which is only available in a pack with internet and/or telephone.

Content discovery services 

Proximus TV uses Jinni's technology to offer personalized taste channels and the ability to automatically search for content which is airing now and should suit the taste of the observer.

Content and services offering

TV channels

Belgian free-to-air television channels (national and regional) 

VRT (Dutch-speaking area)
RTBF (French-speaking area)
BRF (German-speaking area)

Free to air television channels from other European countries 

United Kingdom (BBC One, BBC Two optional package required for (BBC Entertainment and BBC First)
France (TF1, France 2, France 3)
Germany (ARD, ZDF, RTL)
Netherlands (Nederland 1, Nederland 2, Nederland 3)
Italy (Rai 1, Rai 2, Rai 3)
India (DD National, Zee News, DD News, Zee Tv, Sony PIX)

International television channels (free to air) 

TV5MONDE (Europe)
DW-TV (Europe)
RT
ABP Live (Asia)
Times Now (India)

International television channels (free to view) 

CNN International
CNBC Europe
BBC World News
India Today Television

Gender-based premium thematic packages 

Kids (French/Dutch)
Entertainment (French/Dutch)
Factual and Documentaries (French/Dutch)
Sports and Lifestyle (French/Dutch)
Nostalgie (French only)
Music and Culture
Adult
Premium and pay-per-view sports
Proximus Sports Multi-Live 10

Catch-Up TV 
Catch Up TV services known as TV Replay and TV Replay + are offered for the following television channels
As of 1 June 2015 TV Replay will now be included - at no extra charge - in Packs with Internet Everywhere.

RTL stations : RTL TVI, RTL TVI HD, Plug RTL, Plug RTL HD, Club RTL, Club RTL HD
RTBF stations : La Une, La Une HD, La Deux, La Deux HD, La Trois, La Trois HD
AB stations: AB3, AB3 HD 
VRT stations : één, één HD, Canvas, Canvas HD, Ketnet
Medialaan stations : vtm, vtm HD, vtmKzoom, Jim, Vitaya, 2BE, 2BE HD, anne
De Vijver Media stations : VIER, VIER HD, VIJF, VIJF HD
BITES EUROPE NV station : Acht 
Proximus stations : Proximus 11, Proximus 11+ HD and Proximus 5.

Video on Demand

Movies & Series Pass 
Unlimited access to a whole range of top movies and series

Netflix 
As of the 16th of December 2014 Netflix is available from the menu of the STB.

Disney+ 
As of the 15th of September 2020 Disney+ is available from the menu of the STB.

Cinefeel Pass 
Classic movies and movies from European and other independent publishers

Hollywood movies 
Including latest cinematic and same day DVD releases

Proximus 11 & Proximus 11+ 
All the matches of the Jupiler Pro League on Proximus 11 and on Proximus 11+ the entire UEFA Champions League and its Multi Live, the best of the English League Cup, the best of Iberian football with the Spanish League, the Copa del Rey (final not included) and the Portuguese League.

Kids Pass 
Unlimited access to favorite movies and series (more than 500) in a secure and child-friendly environment.

X-Adult Pass 
Unlimited access to more than 200 clips for adults

Hotstar
India Basically Bollywood OTP

Radio stations 
RTBF radio network (French)
RTL radio network (French)
VRT radion network including regional variations (Flemish)
BRF (German-speaking region)

Mobile TV 
Customers with the Comfort or Maxi pack have free access to TV Partout/TV Overal to watch on a PC, Smartphone or tablet up to 40 channels and can use the TV Replay/TV Replay+ for a limited number of channels.

See also 
 List of Proximus TV channels
 Belgacom
 Belgacom (ISP)

External links
Proximus TV

References

Proximus Group
Television broadcasting companies of Belgium